Sir Walter Derek Thornley Hodgson (24 May 1917 – 10 October 2002) was a British barrister and High Court judge. He presided over the Blakelock trial in 1987.

References

 https://www.ukwhoswho.com/view/10.1093/ww/9780199540891.001.0001/ww-9780199540884-e-20403
 https://www.thetimes.co.uk/article/sir-derek-hodgson-sp7b3p63s7q
 https://www.telegraph.co.uk/news/obituaries/1410774/Sir-Derek-Hodgson.html
 https://www.theguardian.com/news/2002/oct/23/guardianobituaries

1917 births
2002 deaths
Place of birth missing
Place of death missing